Shooting star refers to a meteor.

Shooting star may also refer to:

Film, television, and theater

Film
 Shooting Star (2015 film), a 2015 Bulgarian short film
 Shooting Star (2020 film), a 2020 Canadian short film
 Shooting Stars (1927 film), a 1927 British drama film
 Shooting Stars (1950 film), a 1950 film
 Shooting Stars (1952 film), a 1952 West German drama film
 Shooting Stars (1983 film), a 1983 television film, starring Billy Dee Williams
 Shooting Stars (1997 film) ((), a 1997 French comedy produced by Richard Sadler

Television series
 Sh**ting Stars, a 2022 South Korean television show
 Shooting Stars (British TV series), a British comedy television show
 Shooting Stars (Singaporean TV series), a 2005 Singaporean TV drama
 Shooting Star (animated series), a 2020 television series by 41 Entertainment

Episodes
 "Shooting Stars" (CSI), a 2005 sixth-season episode of CSI
 "Shooting Star" (Glee), a 2013 episode of the television show Glee

Plays and other entertainment uses
 Shooting Star, a play by Steven Dietz
 Shooting Stars, a play by Molly Newman
Star Trek: Phaser Strike (called Shooting Star in Germany, Italy and UK), a 1979 video game for the Microvision
 Shooting Stars Award, annually presented to 10 young European actors at the Berlin International Film Festival
 The Shooting Star, the name of Racer X's car in Mach GoGoGo media

Literature

Shooting Stars, a 2016 novel by Brian Falkner
Shooting Star, a 1958 novel by Robert Bloch
 Shooting Star (Temple novel), by Australian Peter Temple
 The Shooting Star, a 1942 Tintin adventure
 Shooting Star (comics), a character from Marvel Comics

Music

 Shooting Star (band), a rock band from Kansas City, Missouri

Albums
 Shooting Star (Elkie Brooks album), 1978
 Shooting Star (Shooting Star album), 1980
 Shooting Stars (album), a 1979 album by Dollar
 Shooting Star (EP), a 2012 EP by Owl City, and the title song

Songs 
"Baby Can I Hold You/Shooting Star", by Boyzone
"Shooting Star" (Air Traffic song), 2007
"Shooting Star" (Bad Company song), 1975
"Shooting Star" (Bang! song), 1997, later covered by Flip & Fill
"Shooting Star" (David Rush song), 2009
"Shooting Star" (Deepest Blue song), 2004
"Shooting Star" (Disney song), from Disney's Hercules
"Shooting Star" (Bob Dylan song), 1989
"Shooting Star" (Elton John song), 1978
"Shooting Star" (Modern Talking song), 2006
"Shooting Star" (Poison song), 2002
"Shooting Star" (Owl City song), 2012
"Shooting Star" (Tara McDonald song), 2013
"Shooting Stars" (Bag Raiders song), 2010
"Shooting Stars" (Dragon song), 1977
"Shooting Star" by The Mamas & the Papas, from the 1971 album People Like Us
"Shooting Star", by Lou Reed, from the 1978 album Street Hassle
"Shooting Star", by Cross Gene
"Shooting Star" by Harry Chapin, from the 1974 album Verities & Balderdash
"Shooting Star" by Dollar, from the album Shooting Stars
"Shooting Star" by the Australian band Expatriate, from the 2007 album In the Midst of This
"Shooting Star" by Riyu Kosaka, from the 2003 album BeForU
"Shooting Star" by Cliff Richard and The Shadows, from the 1966 film Thunderbirds Are Go
"Shooting Star" by Órla Fallon, from the 2009 album Distant Shore
"Shooting Star" by Elliott Smith, from the 2004 album From a Basement on the Hill
"Shooting Stars" by Amy Diamond, from the 2005 album This Is Me Now
"Shooting Star" by everset, Kamen Rider Meteor's theme on the series Kamen Rider Fourze
"The Shooting Star" by Gojira, from the 2016 album Magma
"Shooting Star" by VIXX from the 2016 album Kratos
"Shooting Star" by Gene Clark from the 1973 album Roadmaster
"Shooting Star" by Muna
"Shooting Star" by XG

Science and mathematics 
 Hypervelocity star, a type of star that moves at unusually high velocities across the galaxy
 Primula sect. Dodecatheon, a group of herbaceous flowering plants in the genus Primula
 Primula pauciflora, also known as pretty shooting star, few-flowered shooting star, dark throat shooting star and prairie shooting star

Sport 
 Shooting Stars F.C., a Nigerian football club
 NBA All-Star Weekend Shooting Stars Competition, a basketball competition
 A professional wrestling aerial technique

Transportation
 P-80 Shooting Star, a United States Army Air Forces jet fighter
 T-33 Shooting Star,  an American-built jet trainer
 Shooting Star (clipper), an extreme clipper ship built in 1851
 Another 1851 extreme clipper, USS Ino, which served in the Civil War. It was renamed Shooting Star in 1867.
 A BR 'Britannia' class steam locomotive
 A GWR Star Class, steam locomotive
 A logo displayed on many Hokutosei locomotives, including:
 JNR Class DD51, a diesel-hydraulic locomotive type operated in Japan since 1962
 JR Freight Class EF510, a multi-voltage AC/DC electric locomotive type operated in Japan since 2002

Other uses
 Shooting Star (spacecraft), an expendable cargo module for the Dream Chaser spacecraft
 Shooting Star (drone), quadcopter drone by Intel
 Tecumseh (1768–1813), whose Shawnee name has been translated as Shooting Star
 Shooting Star Casino, in Minnesota
 Bay 101 Shooting Star, a World Poker Tour tournament
 Shooting star (candlestick pattern), in finance
 Shooting Star Tommy Gun, a carnival amusement game
 Shooting Star, Ace's aircraft from the arcade games TwinBee Yahho! and Sexy Parodius

See also
 Falling star (disambiguation)
 Ryūsei (disambiguation)